Mstyora may refer to:
Mstyora (inhabited locality), name of several inhabited localities in Russia
Mstyora railway station, a railway station in Vladimir Oblast, Russia
Lake Mstyora, a lake in Vladimir Oblast, Russia
Mstyora River, a river in Vladimir Oblast, Russia